Canadian College Italy, also known as CCI, is an independent Canadian-accredited school in Lanciano, Abruzzo, Italy. The school is a co-educational university-preparatory school for grades 9 to 12.

CCI operates under the supervision of the Ontario Ministry of Education, as outlined by the Ministry's guidelines for Overseas Schools. The school prepares students for entrance into universities in the United States, UK, Canada and Europe. The school motto is Perge et Valeas (Proceed and you shall Succeed).

History
Canadian College Italy (CCI) was founded by Marisa DiCarlo D'Alessandro in 1995 in Lanciano, Italy. CCI is Canada's only private high school in Italy and is a co-ed boarding school for Canadian, American and International students wishing to study abroad.

The Mission statement for the school is, "To provide a unique environment in which students experience a Renaissance: Academically, Socially and Culturally."

Facilities
The main school building is a 14th-century three story stone and brick palazzo which is located on Via Cavour. This was a family home as early as the 1300s, and was later used as the Canadian Headquarters for troops during the World War II.

CCI Boys live on the top floor of the school building on Via Cavour. The girls are housed in the Town's oldest Inn, Antica Locanda Allegria.

Academics
The School offers grades 9, 10, 11 and 12, and students may enroll for a single semester or for up to three academic years (two semesters per year). CCI is inspected by the Ministry of Education in the province of Ontario, Canada and students earn credits toward the Ontario Secondary School Diploma. CCI is also a member of the European Council of International Schools.

External links
Official website
Directory of Offshore International Schools
Ontario Ministry of Education

International schools in Italy
Schools in Abruzzo
1995 establishments in Italy
Educational institutions established in 1995